Earthquake Weather is the only album by former frontman of The Clash, Joe Strummer, released on September 20, 1989. The album was well received by critics, but was not a commercial success. The majority of the album was recorded in Los Angeles, California in 1988 and 1989, as evident from the cover photography and design by Josh Cheuse.

It was the first time Strummer had worked on his own musical project. In previous years he had worked with Alex Cox on the soundtracks of his films Sid and Nancy and Walker in 1986 and 1987. He also worked on the production of his former Clash partner Mick Jones' second album with the band Big Audio Dynamite in 1986.
 
It was the reception and sales of the music score from the film Walker that got Strummer into a well mental state to start working on his own material again. He got a group together which consisted of Zander Schloss, Lonnie Marshall, Jack Irons and Willie MacNeil. The backing band became known as The Latino Rockabilly War. The first project the band worked on was for the film Permanent Record with Keanu Reeves which featured the songs "Trash City", "Baby the Trans", "Nothin' 'bout Nothin", "Nefertiti Rock", and the haunting instrumental "Theme from Permanent Record".

In 2008 the album was re-released although it was not remastered and the version was very bare bones featuring no liner notes and basically a CD-R version of the album.

Track listing

Personnel
Joe Strummer - vocals, rhythm guitar, piano, percussion
Zander Schloss - lead guitar, Spanish guitar, organ, banjo, lyre, vocals
Lonnie Marshall - bass, piano, percussion, vocals
Jack Irons - drums (tracks 1, 4, 6, 9, 10, 12)
Willie McNeil - drums (tracks 2, 3, 5, 7, 8, 11, 13, 14)
with:
Del Zamora, Dick Rude, Rudy Fernandez - male voice trio
Technical
Mark Stebbeds - recording, mixing
Josh Cheuse - cover photography, art direction

Bibliography

References

Joe Strummer albums
1989 albums
Epic Records albums